is the county seat of Orange County, California. Located in the Greater Los Angeles region of Southern California, the city's population was 310,227 at the 2020 census, making Santa Ana the second most populous city in Orange County (after Anaheim), the 13th-most populous city in California, and the 64th densest large city in the United States. Santa Ana is a major regional economic and cultural hub for the Orange Coast.

Santa Ana's origins began in 1810, when the Spanish governor of California granted Rancho Santiago de Santa Ana to José Antonio Yorba. Following the Mexican War of Independence, the Yorba family rancho was enlarged, becoming one of the largest and most valuable in the region and home to a diverse Californio community. Following the American Conquest of California, the rancho was sold to the Sepúlveda family, who subsequently lost their land claim. In 1869, William H. Spurgeon then purchased the rancho and formally founded the modern city of Santa Ana.

Approximately four-fifths Latino, Santa Ana has been characterized by The New York Times as the "face of a new California, a state where Latinos have more influence in everyday life—electorally, culturally and demographically—than almost anywhere else in the country."

History

Members of the Tongva and Juaneño/Luiseño are indigenous to the area. The Tongva called the Santa Ana area "Hotuuk." The village of Pajbenga was located at modern day Santa Ana along the Santa Ana River.

Spanish and Mexican eras

After the 1769 expedition of Gaspar de Portolá out of Mexico City, then capital of New Spain, Friar Junípero Serra named the area Vallejo de Santa Ana (Valley of Saint Anne, or Santa Ana Valley). On November 1, 1776, Mission San Juan Capistrano was established within this valley.

In 1810, the first year of the Mexican War of Independence, Jose Antonio Yorba, a sergeant of the Spanish army, was granted land that he called Rancho Santiago de Santa Ana. Yorba's rancho included the lands where the cities of Olive, Orange, Irvine, Yorba Linda, Villa Park, Santa Ana, Tustin, Costa Mesa and unincorporated El Modena, and Santa Ana Heights, are today. This rancho was the only land grant in Orange County granted under Spanish Rule. Surrounding land grants in Orange County were granted after Mexican Independence by the new government.

After the Mexican-American war ended in 1848, Alta California became part of the United States and American settlers arrived in this area.

Post-Conquest era
Santa Ana was listed as a township of Los Angeles County in the 1860 and 1870 census, with an area encompassing most of what is now northern and central Orange County.  It had a population of 756 in 1860 and 880 in 1870.  The Anaheim district was enumerated separately from Santa Ana in 1870.

Claimed in 1869 by Kentuckian William H. Spurgeon on land obtained from the descendants of Jose Antonio Yorba, Santa Ana was incorporated as a city in 1886 with a population of 2000 and in 1889 became the seat of the newly formed Orange County.

In 1877, the Southern Pacific Railroad built a branch line from Los Angeles to Santa Ana, which offered free right of way, land for a depot, and $10,000 in cash to the railroad in exchange for terminating the line in Santa Ana and not neighboring Tustin. In 1887, the California Central Railway (which became a subsidiary of the Atchison, Topeka and Santa Fe Railway the following year) broke the Southern Pacific's local monopoly on rail travel, offering service between Los Angeles and San Diego by way of Santa Ana as a major intermediate station. 

In 1890, whites made up 71 percent of the city's population, most of whom migrated to Santa Ana from confederate states following the American Civil War in search of real estate ventures and other economic opportunities.

20th century

By 1905, the Los Angeles Interurban Railway, a predecessor to the Pacific Electric Railway, extended from Los Angeles to Santa Ana, running along Fourth Street downtown. Firestone Boulevard, the first direct automobile route between Los Angeles and Santa Ana, opened in 1935; it was enlarged into the Santa Ana Freeway in 1953. The Pacific Electric Santa Ana Line ran from 1905 to 1958.

Santa Ana was the home of the original Glenn L. Martin aviation company, founded in 1912 before merging with the Wright Company in 1916. Later, Glenn Luther Martin created a second company of the same name in Cleveland, Ohio which eventually merged with the Lockheed Corporation to form the largest defense contractor in the world, Lockheed Martin.

Although there was a significant wave of Mexican migration to the city following the 1910 Mexican Revolution, the city remained majority white in 1939.

During World War II, the Santa Ana Army Air Base was built as a training center for the United States Army Air Forces. The base was responsible for continued population growth in Santa Ana and the rest of Orange County as many veterans moved to the area to raise families after the end of the war.

Santa Ana was at the center of Orange County's economic boom in the 1950s with its agricultural and defense industries. However, most of this prosperity was only experienced by the city's white residents, while Latinos did not similarly benefit. Instead, economic inequality between the two groups rapidly increased during this time.

In 1958, the Honer Plaza and Bullock's Fashion Square malls opened and would supplant Downtown Santa Ana, with its department stores such as Rankin's, Ward's, Penney's and Buffums. Fashion Square was completely renovated and became MainPlace Mall in 1987.

Latino city 

By the 1970s, Santa Ana was becoming an increasingly Latino city, with white flight to surrounding suburbs coinciding with the city's downtown becoming increasingly frequented by Latinos. This changed perceptions of the city and its economic value, with property values dropping significantly by 1974, while surrounding cities of Laguna Beach, Newport Beach, and Villa Park increased in value.

Santa Ana entered the 1980s as a city of equal numbers of whites and Latinos. What had been the white commercial center of the city, Fourth Street, was now a street of Latino businesses and character. Latino immigrant and working-class families could now be found in every neighborhood of the city, rather than in just a few ethnic enclaves, as they were previously. Santa Ana became more often referred to as Santana and Fourth Street as La Cuatro.

Having been a charter city since November 11, 1952, the citizens of Santa Ana amended the charter in November 1988 to provide for the direct election of the Mayor who until that point had been appointed from the council membership. Miguel A. Pulido was the first mayor of Latino descent in the city's history and the first Mayor directly elected by the voters.

Since the 1980s, Santa Ana has been characterized by an effort to revitalize the downtown area which had declined in influence, even as it had become a dynamic commercial and entertainment center for working-class Latinos. The Santa Ana Artist's Village was created around Cal State Fullerton's Grand Central Art Center to attract artists and young professionals to live-work lofts and new businesses. The process continued into 2009 with the reopening of the historic Yost Theater.In the 2010s, gentrification became a larger concern of Santa Ana residents, with its roots starting in the 1990s. Despite strong Latino political representation, gentrification efforts have increasingly displaced the Mexican immigrant presence in the downtown area of the city in favor of outsiders. Primarily Spanish-speaking businesses that served immigrant populations have been demolished in favor of arts projects to draw in outside investment, which bring clientele who further question why Spanish-speaking businesses are present, leading to a cycle of displacement.

Residents formed a social movement to address lead concentrations in lower-income areas of the city. A 2020 study found that areas of Santa Ana with a median income below $50,000 had five times higher lead concentrations than higher-income areas of the city, which is particularly a concern for children. Residents continue to advocate for environmental justice in the city.

Geography

Santa Ana is located at  (33.740717, -117.881408).

With 12,471.5 people per sq. mile, it is the fourth-most densely populated city in the United States with a population of 300,000 or more.

Santa Ana is nested on flat, low-lying plains with little land elevation change. Running through the west end of the city is the mostly channelized Santa Ana River, which is also largely seasonal due to the construction of the Prado Dam and Seven Oaks Dam. The river has caused several severe floods in the 20th century, and is a continued threat despite the existence of the dams.

Cityscape

Now fully developed, Santa Ana has several distinct districts. The core of the city is the downtown area, which contains both retail and housing, as well as the Santa Ana Civic Center, which is a dense campus of administrative buildings for both the city and the county of Orange. The civic center is also home to the Ronald Reagan Federal Building and Courthouse. Several historic homes dating from the late 1800s can be found as well, and their preservation is a key issue as development of the downtown area continues.

North of downtown is the "Midtown" district along Main St., home to entertainment destinations such as the Bowers Museum, MainPlace Mall, and the Discovery Science Center.

Near the intersection of the Santa Ana Freeway and the Costa Mesa Freeway is the newly designated "Metro East" area, which the city council has envisioned as a secondary mixed-use development district. Currently the area is occupied by several office towers, but little retail or housing. Also on the east side of the city is the Santa Ana Zoo, notable for its collection of monkeys and species from South and Central America.

The southeast end of the city is part of the South Coast Metro area, which is shared with the city of Costa Mesa. South Coast Plaza, a major shopping center, is the primary destination of this area, which also contains several high-rise office and apartment buildings. Yokohama Tire Corporation's United States headquarters are located at 1 MacArthur Place in the South Coast Metro area of Santa Ana, and Banc of California's headquarters relocated from the neighboring city of Irvine.

Climate

Santa Ana experiences a hot semi-arid climate (Köppen: BSh), with hot, dry summers and mild winters with moderate rainfall. There are an average of 36 days with measurable precipitation annually.

Demographics
The most common Hispanic ancestries in Santa Ana are Mexican, Salvadorian and Guatemalan. The most common European ancestries are German, Irish, English and Italian. By the late 1970s, African-American families began to move out of Santa Ana.

2020
The 2020 United States Census reported that Santa Ana had a population of 310,227. The racial makeup of Santa Ana was 8.5% Non-Hispanic White, 1.1% African American, 3.7% Native American, 12.3% Asian, 0.3% Pacific islander, 45.1% Other, 19.1% two or more races, and 76.7% Hispanic or Latino.

2010

The 2010 United States Census reported that Santa Ana had a population of 324,528. The racial makeup of Santa Ana was 148,838 (45.9%) White (9.2% Non-Hispanic White), 4,856 (1.5%) African American, 3,260 (1.0%) Native American, 34,138 (10.5%) Asian, 976 (0.3%) Pacific Islander, 120,789 (37.2%) from other races, and 11,671 (3.6%) from two or more races. Hispanic or Latino people of any race were 253,928 persons (78.2%).

The census reported that 319,870 people (98.6% of the population) lived in households, 1,415 (0.4%) lived in non-institutionalized group quarters, and 3,243 (1.0%) were institutionalized.

There were 73,174 households, out of which 41,181 (56.3%) had children under the age of 18 living in them, 41,389 (56.6%) were opposite-sex married couples living together, 11,808 (16.1%) had a female householder with no husband present, 6,451 (8.8%) had a male householder with no wife present.  There were 4,933 (6.7%) unmarried opposite-sex partnerships, and 556 (0.8%) same-sex married couples or partnerships. 9,254 households (12.6%) were made up of individuals, and 3,378 (4.6%) had someone living alone who was 65 years of age or older. The average household size was 4.37.  There were 59,648 families (81.5% of all households); the average family size was 4.54.

The age distribution of the population was as follows: 99,678 people (30.7%) under the age of 18, 39,165 people (12.1%) aged 18 to 24, 102,399 people (31.6%) aged 25 to 44, 61,375 people (18.9%) aged 45 to 64, and 21,911 people (6.8%) who were 65 years of age or older.  The median age was 29.1 years. For every 100 females, there were 104.4 males.  For every 100 females age 18 and over, there were 104.6 males.

The homeowner vacancy rate was 1.9%; the rental vacancy rate was 4.9%.  154,045 people (47.5% of the population) lived in owner-occupied dwelling units and 165,825 people (51.1%) lived in rental dwelling units.

During 20092013, Santa Ana had a median household income of $53,335, with 21.5% of the population living below the federal poverty line.

2000

As of the census of 2000, there were 337,977 people, 73,002 households, and 59,788 families residing in the city.  The population density was 4,808.2/km2 (12,451.9/mi2). There were 74,588 housing units at an average density of 1,061.1/km2 (2,748.0/mi2).  The racial makeup of the city was 42.73% White, 1.70% African American, 1.19% Native American, 8.81% Asian, 0.34% Pacific Islander, 40.64% from other races, and 4.58% from two or more races.  76.07% of the population were Hispanic or Latino of any race.

There were 73,002 households, out of which 53.2% had children under the age of 18 living with them, 60.6% were married couples living together, 13.5% had a female householder with no husband present, and 18.1% were non-families. 12.7% of all households were made up of individuals, and 4.6% had someone living alone who was 65 years of age or older.  The average household size was 4.55 and the average family size was 4.72.

In the city, the population was spread out, with 34.2% under the age of 18, 12.8% from 18 to 24, 34.1% from 25 to 44, 13.5% from 45 to 64, and 5.5% who were 65 years of age or older.  The median age was 26 years.  For every 100 females, there were 107.7 males.  For every 100 females age 18 and over, there were 108.7 males.

The median income for a household from 2005 to 2009 was $54,521. The median income for a household in the city was $43,412, and the median income for a family was $41,050. Males had a median income of $23,342 versus $21,637 for females. The per capita income for the city was $12,152.  19.8% of the population and 16.1% of families were below the poverty line.  Out of the total population, 24.1% of those under the age of 18 and 10.4% of those 65 and older were living below the poverty line.

Economy

Santa Ana is the corporate headquarters of several companies, including Behr Paint, First American Corporation, Greenwood & Hall, Ingram Micro, SchoolsFirst Federal Credit Union, STEC, TTM Technologies, Kern's, and Wahoo's Fish Taco. It also houses major regional headquarters for the Xerox corporation, Ultimate Software, and T-Mobile. Nonprofits based in Santa Ana include Open Doors.

One of Santa Ana's most notable businesses is the Rickenbacker musical instrument company, whose electric guitars and bass guitars earned fame in the hands of many rock and roll legends.

Then Glenn L. Martin Company, a precursor to Lockheed Martin, was founded in Santa Ana in 1912 before merging with the Wright Company in 1916.

In recent years, the nearby city of Irvine has outpaced Santa Ana in commercial growth, with the Irvine Business District located near John Wayne Airport. To compete with this, Santa Ana has approved commercial projects in the South Coast Metro area, as well as the "Metro East" development, located at the confluence of the Santa Ana Freeway and the Costa Mesa Freeway.

The Historic South Main Business District contains many older retail shops and other small businesses. It extends from downtown Santa Ana southwards on Main Street to the South Coast Metro area.

There was a recession in the 2000s, and the expected year for return to peak employment for the Los Angeles-Long Beach-Santa Ana area was 2015. The pre-recession peak year was 2007. Due to the recession, 519,300  jobs were lost, a 9% decrease. According to the Employment Development Department, the unemployment rate for 2015 was 5 percent.

Top employers

According to the city's 2021 Annual Comprehensive Financial Report, the top employers in the city are:

Other large employers include Western Medical Center, TTM Technologies, MSC Software Corp, and Sterns Learning Inc.

Arts and culture

The Bowers Museum is art and history museum started in the 1930s with a large collection of fine art and artifacts from around the world and several traveling exhibits each year.

Santa Ana has several wall paintings and murals depicting local history, community events and cultural diversity in Orange County.

The Chiarini Fountain, designed and carved by Chiarini Marble & Stone, was donated by the Chiarini family in honor of George C. Chiarini and to recognize the artists who have helped make Downtown Santa Ana a creative center in Orange County.

Greenville, a former rural part of Santa Ana, has buildings over a century old, but industrial complexes have replaced the agricultural fields once surrounding the town.

Santa Ana has a number of parks.  The Disneyland and Knott's Berry Farm amusement parks are located northwest of Santa Ana, several kilometers away. Beaches are located around 20 minutes to the south, accessible by the 55 freeway. Huntington Beach and Newport Beach as well as other coastal communities offer shopping, dining, boating, swimming and surfing.

Sites of interest

*Artist Village and Civic Center (see Downtown Santa Ana Historic Districts)
CSUF Grand Central Art Center - at the heart of the Artist Village in Santa Ana
Discovery Science Center
Downtown National Register District
Downtown Santa Ana Historic Districts
El Centro Cultural de México
Main Place Mall - opened in 1987
Old Orange County Courthouse
Santa Ana Civic Center
Santa Ana College, part of the Rancho Santiago Community College District
Santa Ana Zoo, built in 1960
Pacific Electric Sub-Station No. 14
Rankin Building - once Santa Ana's iconic local department store
Bowers Museum
Yost Theater
Lyon Air Museum
The Kellogg House
South Coast Metro
John Wayne Airport
MainPlace Mall
Heritage Museum of Orange County

Sports

Santa Ana has highly competitive high school and collegiate sports teams playing at Santa Ana Stadium and the Santa Ana Unified School District Sports Complex Stadium.

The Dons of Santa Ana College are one of the most successful soccer teams in the state of California, and is a frequent top finisher, statewide. In 2008, the Dons clinched their fifteenth consecutive Orange Empire Conference title. The college is also known for its historically successful baseball teams, and for producing former Texas Rangers and Los Angeles Angels pitcher C. J. Wilson.

Mater Dei High School has one of the most successful and reputable football programs in the country.

Government

Santa Ana utilizes a mayor-council form of government.  The council consists of six members who are elected by the populace of the city.  Each member serves for four years and can serve a total of three terms. A mayor pro tem is elected by the council members from within the council.

Like most majority-minority cities in the United States, Santa Ana is a stronghold of the Democratic Party. Despite the city's high percentage of Democrats, the city tends to vote conservatively on social issues, much like the rest of northern Orange County. It voted in favor of Proposition 8—California's amendment defining marriage in the state as a legal union between a man and a woman—by 61.9%, above the county's average of 57.7%. On Proposition 4, which would have amended the California Constitution to require minors to notify their parents before having an abortion, Santa Ana voted in favor of the measure by 62.0%, much higher than the county as a whole, which voted in favor of the measure by only 54.3%.

The Consulate-General of Mexico in Santa Ana is located on 828 North Broadway Street. The Consulate-General of El Salvador in Santa Ana is located in Suite 103 at 840 North Grand Avenue.

Education

Santa Ana Unified School District includes 37 K–5 elementary schools, nine 6–8 intermediate schools, eight 9–12 high schools, five special schools, and one charter school. Some elementary schools are: John Adams Elementary School, Manuel Esqueda Elementary School, Diamond Elementary School.
The school district provides an online accountability report card.
The Garden Grove Unified School District also includes some schools within Santa Ana.

Santa Ana Unified School District's public high schools include Valley High School (Santa Ana), Middle College High School, Santa Ana High School, Saddleback High School, Century High School, newly opened Segerstrom Fundamental High School and Godinez Fundamental High School, and other public schools in the area, along with the Orange County School of the Arts in the midtown district.

The Roman Catholic Diocese operates Mater Dei High School. The Diocese also operates several K–8 schools in Santa Ana, including School of Our Lady, Saint Anne, Saint Barbara, and Saint Joseph. Immaculate Heart Of Mary And Our Lady Of the Pillar schools were closed in 2005 and merged into the School of Our Lady, which is located at Immaculate Heart of Mary Parish. (See Roman Catholic Diocesan Schools in Santa Ana, California). In September 2005 the Orange County Campus of International School of Los Angeles (LILA) moved to Santa Ana. In July 2015 it moved back to Orange.

The city is also home to Santa Ana College, a two-year public community college, as well as California Coast University, and the Orange County branch of the Art Institute of California. Taft Law School, a correspondence law school, is also based in Santa Ana. Trinity Law School is a Christian, CBE-accredited law school that is the only California campus of the Trinity International University system of schools. Detective Training Institute is a correspondence/distance learning institution that offers private investigator diplomas and is approved to operate by the Bureau for Private Postsecondary Education. Career Networks Institute College, a post-secondary occupational learning center for allied health, is also based in the city.

Infrastructure

Transportation

A few freeways run through Santa Ana, connecting it to other areas in Orange County, the Greater Los Angeles Area, and beyond. The Santa Ana Freeway (Interstate 5) heads north to Los Angeles, and south towards Southern Orange County and San Diego. The Garden Grove Freeway (State Route 22) runs along near Santa Ana's northern border, connecting Long Beach to the west and the City of Orange to the east. The Costa Mesa Freeway (State Route 55) travels south to Costa Mesa; and then north to the Riverside Freeway (State Route 91), providing a connection to Riverside.

Amtrak, the national passenger rail system, provides service to Santa Ana several times on weekdays with less frequent service on weekends. It operates its Pacific Surfliner between San Diego to the south and either Los Angeles or San Luis Obispo to the north (see Santa Ana Regional Transportation Center). Greyhound Lines is the largest bus transportation service in Santa Ana, and serves the continental United States and Canada. The bus lines Crucero, Intercalifornias, and others serve all points into Mexico.

The Santa Ana Regional Transportation Center is also served by commuter rail trains of Metrolink: the Orange County Line (Oceanside to Union Station), and Inland Empire–Orange County Line (San Bernardino to Oceanside).

Public transit bus service is available via the Orange County Transportation Authority (OCTA) and is mainly focused on busses and freeways. A 4.15-mile OCTA light rail line running between Santa Ana and Garden Grove, the OC Streetcar, is currently under construction and planned to enter service in 2022.

John Wayne Airport is located at 18601 Airport Way Santa Ana, CA 92707. The IATA code for the airport is SNA.

Utilities
Electricity for the city is provided by Southern California Edison. The Southern California Gas Company provides natural gas service.  Phone and cable television service is provided by AT&T.

Emergency services
Law enforcement is provided by the Santa Ana Police Department from three stations throughout the city. The department includes five canine units, an 11-officer equestrian unit and a 37-member SWAT team. The city shares a helicopter with the cities of Costa Mesa and Newport Beach via the Airborne Law Enforcement (ABLE) program.

In March 2012, the city disbanded its municipal fire department, which had provided fire protection for 128 years, and contracted with the Orange County Fire Authority.

Notable people

See also

List of California communities with Hispanic majority populations
List of U.S. cities with large Hispanic populations
Rancho Cañón de Santa Ana (Santa Ana Canyon Ranch)
Rancho San Juan Cajón de Santa Ana
Rancho Santiago de Santa Ana
Santa Ana (Amtrak station)
Santa Ana Canyon
Santa Ana Civic Center
Santa Ana Freeway
Santa Ana Heights
Santa Ana Mountains
Santa Ana River
Santa Ana Stadium
Santa Ana Valley
Santa Ana Watershed
Santa Ana wind
Santiago Creek
Santora Building
Yost Theater

References

External links

 
1869 establishments in California
1886 establishments in California
Cities in Orange County, California
County seats in California
Incorporated cities and towns in California
Populated places established in 1869
Populated places established in 1886
Populated places on the Santa Ana River